Sweden used a national preselction called Melodifestivalen 1983 to select an entry for the 28th edition of the Eurovision Song Contest. Winner, being the first participant ever to get maximum points from all of the eleven juries, was the 17-year-old and then unknown Carola Häggkvist, who quickly went on to be one of Sweden's most popular singers. The song she competed with was called "Främling". It was written by Lasse Holm and Monica Forsberg, who had also written the previous winning song together.

Before Eurovision

Melodifestivalen 1983
Melodifestivalen 1983 was the selection for the 23rd song to represent Sweden at the Eurovision Song Contest. It was the 22nd time that this system of picking a song had been used. 90 songs were submitted to Sveriges Television for the competition. The final was held in the Palladium in Malmö on 26 February 1983, presented by Bibi Johns and was broadcast on TV1 but was not broadcast on radio. Carola was the only artist to score full marks from each jury, prompting the presenter to say before the final votes were announced: "Det här är inte alls spännande!" (This isn't at all exciting!).

Voting

At Eurovision
The final, held in Munich, attracted an estimate of 5,6 million viewers (about 70% of Sweden's population back then). Carola was drawn #4 in a field of 20 and was considered a big favourite for the title.

Sweden received 12 points from Norway and Germany, and ended up with 126 points and a 3rd place. It was also Sweden's 3rd best placement so far.

Voting

References

External links
TV broadcastings at SVT's open archive

1983
Countries in the Eurovision Song Contest 1983
1983
Eurovision
Eurovision